The Seychelles Coast Guard (SCG) is a branch of the Seychelles People's Defence Force created in 1993. It is a maritime, military, multi-mission service. They acquired responsibility for search and rescue for vessel incidents as well as environmental protection from the Seychelles Port Authority, formerly known as the Port and Marine Services Division.

Although the Seychelles are a small country, it is located off the Horn of Africa, strategically close to the operation of notorious pirates. Sri Lanka, China, United Arab Emirates and India have made strategic donations of patrol vessels to the Seychelles. 

Through the Seychelles Coast Guard's employment of her small fleet, Seychelles has been able to arrest, try, and convict many pirates. In 2013 the UAE paper The National reported that Seychelles was imprisoning more than 100 convicted pirates at the time.

In May 2011, the SCG helped to protect the privacy of The Duke and Duchess of Cambridge during their honeymoon on the North Island. At the end of their stay, the couple invited several members of the Coast Guard ashore to personally thank them for their efforts.

Equipment 
Patrol ships are named after local fishing banks and natural features.

Current vessels

Former vessels 

 Andromache

Aircraft 

 Harbin Y-12
 Dornier 228

See also
 Action of 30 March 2010

References

Further reading

External links

U.S. State Dept Article on Seychelles

 
Navies by country